Devil's Backbone may refer to:

Places
Devil's Backbone (rock formation), a rock formation near Charlestown, Indiana
Devils Backbone (Highland County, Virginia), a small mountain in Highland County, Virginia
 Devils Backbone (New York), a mountain in the Catskill Mountains
Devil's Backbone State Forest, a state forest located in Shenandoah County, Virginia
Devils Backbone Wilderness, a protected wilderness area in Ozark County, Missouri
 A ridge in the Ouachita Mountains, in Arkansas
 A ridge near Mount San Antonio in the San Gabriel Mountains, in California
 A region in Texas Hill Country

Plants
Euphorbia tithymaloides, the so-called "Redbird cactus" which is actually a spurge
Kalanchoe daigremontiana, a bryophyllum
Cissus quadrangularis, a perennial plant of the grape family

Other uses
The Devil's Backbone (El espinazo del diablo), a 2001 Spanish film

See also
 Battle of Devil's Backbone, a battle in the American Civil War
 Devils Backbone Brewing Company, a brewpub located in Roseland, Virginia
 Spina bifida, a birth defect